D Company is a 2021 Indian Hindi Language docudrama film, written and directed by Ram Gopal Varma. Produced by Sagar Machanuru  of Spark Production. The film was theatrically released on March 21, 2021 as a prelude to Ram Gopal Varma's D Company web series; also produced by Spark OTT.

Plot

The film chronicles the events leading to Dawood Ibrahim's rise and subsequent formation of the "D" company - an organized crime syndicate running outside India's borders.

Cast 
Ashwat Kanth as Dawood Ibrahimgangster
Shaleen Malhotra as Manya Surve

Reception 
A critic from Pinkvilla opined that "Ram Gopal Varma’s directorial is a crashing bore of a gangster flick".

References

External links 
 

2021 films
Indian gangster films
Indian crime thriller films
Indian sequel films
2021 crime thriller films
Indian docudrama films
Films about organised crime in India
Indian action television series
Indian crime television series
Films set in Mumbai
D-Company
Fictional portrayals of the Maharashtra Police